Diana Lorys (born Ana María Cazorla Vega; 20 October 1940) is a Spanish actress. She appeared in more than fifty films since 1960.

Filmography

References

External links 
 

1940 births
Living people
Spanish film actresses
Actresses from Madrid